Zby is an extinct genus of turiasaurian sauropod dinosaur known from the Late Jurassic (late Kimmeridgian stage) of the Lourinhã Formation, central west Portugal. It contains a single species, Zby atlanticus. It is named after Georges Zbyszewski, who studied the geology and paleontology of Portugal.

Description

Zby was first described and named by Octávio Mateus, Philip D. Mannion and Paul Upchurch in 2014 and the type species is Zby atlanticus, although it was initially thought to be Turiasaurus riodevensis. It is known solely from its holotype, a closely associated partial skeleton including a complete tooth with root, a fragment of cervical neural arch, an anterior chevron, and an almost complete right pectoral girdle and forelimb. Zby is differentiated from other sauropods based on four autapomorphies, including a prominent posteriorly projecting ridge on the humerus at the level of the deltopectoral crest. Zby is suggested to be closely related to Turiasaurus riodevensis from Spain and Portugal, based on its tooth morphology, extreme anteroposterior compression of the proximal end of the radius, and strong beveling of the lateral half of the distal end of the radius, while some other forelimb traits distinguish these two genera. Nearly all other anatomical features suggest that Zby is a non-neosauropod eusauropod, confirming its position as a turiasaurian. Zby is estimated to measure around 16 to 18 metres in length.

References 

Turiasauria
Kimmeridgian life
Late Jurassic dinosaurs of Europe
Jurassic Portugal
Fossils of Portugal
Lourinhã Formation
Fossil taxa described in 2014
Taxa named by Octávio Mateus